KGHT (100.5 FM) is a radio station broadcasting a contemporary hit radio music format. Licensed to El Jebel, Colorado, United States, it serves the Aspen area.  The station is owned by Roaring Fork Broadcasting Co LLC.

External links

GHT
Contemporary hit radio stations in the United States
Radio stations established in 2006